Giovanna Tortora (born 6 April 1965) is an Italian former judoka. She competed at the 1992 Summer Olympics and the 1996 Summer Olympics.

References

External links
 

1965 births
Living people
Italian female judoka
Olympic judoka of Italy
Judoka at the 1992 Summer Olympics
Judoka at the 1996 Summer Olympics
People from Acerra
Sportspeople from the Province of Naples
20th-century Italian women